George Allan England (9 February 1877 - 26 June 1936) was an American writer and explorer, best known for his speculative and science fiction. He attended Harvard University and later in life unsuccessfully ran for Governor of Maine.  England was a socialist and many of his works have socialist themes.

Life
England was born in Nebraska.  He attended Harvard University, where he received Bachelor of Arts (A.B.) and Master of Arts (M.A.) degrees.  In 1912 he stood for Governor of Maine as the candidate of the Socialist Party of America. In that election, he finished in third place with 2,081 votes (1.47%). England died in a hospital in New Hampshire, although there is a legend that he disappeared on a treasure hunt.

Writing
England's writing career took place mainly in New York and Maine. Many of his works have a socialist theme. Influences on England's writing include H. G. Wells, Jack London and 
Algernon Blackwood.

His short story, "The Thing from—'Outside'", which had originally appeared in Hugo Gernsback's magazine Science and Invention, was reprinted in the first issue of the first science fiction magazine, Amazing Stories, in April 1926.  The novel The Air Trust (1915) is the story of a billionaire, Isaac Flint, who attempts to control the very air people breathe, and the violent consequences of his ambition and greed. In the concluding chapter, Flint is described as one of "the most sinister and cruel minds ever evolved upon this planet."

England's trilogy, Darkness and Dawn (published in 1912, 1913 and 1914 as The Vacant World, Beyond the Great Oblivion and Afterglow) tells the story of 2 modern people who awake a thousand years after the earth was devastated by a meteor.  They work to rebuild civilization. Richard A. Lupoff has noted that Darkness and Dawn contains "an unfortunate
element of racism" (the villains who menace the heroes are descended from African-Americans).

Novels

 Darkness and Dawn Series
 The Vacant World (1912)
 Beyond the Great Oblivion (1913)
 The Afterglow (1914)

Other Novels
 Beyond White Seas (1910)
 The Elixir of Hate (1910)
 The Empire in the Air (1914)
 The Air Trust (1915)
 The Fatal Gift (1915)
 The Golden Blight (1916)
 The Gift Supreme (1916)
 Bill Jenkins, Buccaneer (1917)
 Cursed (1919)
 The Flying Legion (1920)
 Adventure Isle (1926)

Short stories
Pod, Bender and Co (October 1916) - Short story collection
 When Pod Took the Count
 A Flyer in Annuities 
 Birds of Passage 
 "Ammunition — With Care" 
 Art for Art's Sake 
 The Old Homestead  
 Pod Flits 
 A Game of Solitaire  
 Crayons and Clay  
 The Turning of the Worm  
 Lobsters and Loot 
 The Supreme Getaway  
 Knight Errants Up-to-Date  
 The Kimberley Special 
 A Passage at Arms 
 Fly-Time
 The Thing--From Outside (2016, short story collection)

Notes

References

External links

 
 
  
 
 Pod, Bender and Co (1916) at Internet Archive

1877 births
1936 deaths
20th-century American novelists
American male novelists
American science fiction writers
Writers from Nebraska
Harvard University alumni
Socialist Party of America politicians from Maine
American male short story writers
20th-century American short story writers
20th-century American male writers